Emily Brady is an analytic philosopher, who specializes in aesthetics, environmental philosophy and history of eighteenth-century philosophy. She is currently a professor of philosophy at Texas A&M University. From 2018 to 2022, she was also Director of the Glasscock Center for Humanities Research, where she held the inaugural Susanne M. and Melbern G. Glasscock Director's Chair. She is best known for her work on the sublime and environmental philosophy.

Biography
Brady earned her PhD in Philosophy at the University of Glasgow in 1992. Until 2018, she was Professor of Environment and Philosophy in the Institute of Geography and
the Lived Environment at the University of Edinburgh. From 1994 to 2004 she was a Lecturer, then a Senior Lecturer in Philosophy at Lancaster University.

Select publications
 The Sublime in Modern Philosophy, Cambridge University Press, 2013
 Aesthetics of the Natural Environment, Edinburgh University Press, 2003
 Aesthetic Concepts: Essays After Sibley (co-edited with Jerrold Levinson), Oxford University Press, 2001
 Environment and Philosophy (with Vernon Pratt and Jane Howarth), Routledge, 2000

References

Living people
Analytic philosophers
21st-century philosophers
Texas A&M University faculty
Academics of the University of Edinburgh
Academics of Lancaster University
Alumni of the University of Glasgow
Year of birth missing (living people)